A magic triangle is a magic arrangement of the integers from 1 to  to triangular figure.

Perimeter magic triangle 

Unlike magic squares, there are different magic sums for magic triangles of the same order.

Examples 

Order-3 magic triangles are the simplest (except for trivial magic triangles of order 1).

Other magic triangles 
Other magic triangles use Triangular number or square number of vertices to form magic figure. Matthew Wright and his students in St. Olaf College developed magic triangles with square numbers. In their magic triangles, the sum of the k-th row and the (n-k+1)-th row is same for all k. Its one modification uses triangular numbers instead of square nubers.  Another magic tringle form is magic triangles with triangluar numbers with different summation. In this magic triangles, the sum of the k-th row and the (n-k)-th row is same for all k.

See also 
Magic hexagon 
Antimagic square
Magic polygon

References 

Magic shapes